The discography of the Bengali independent music band Shironamhin consists of 5 studio albums, 6 mixed albums, 1 EP, 2 Playback singles albums.

Albums

Studio albums

Mixed albums

Playback singles

Extended play

References

External links 

 

Discography
Discographies of Bangladeshi artists
Rock music group discographies